Lacs de Barroude are two lakes in Hautes-Pyrénées, France. At an elevation of 2355 m, the surface area of the largest is 0.094 km².

Lakes of Hautes-Pyrénées